The Zhaowu Pier is a pier at Sun Moon Lake in Yuchi Township, Nantou County, Taiwan.

History
Due to the continuing drought which caused water shortage in the lake in early 2021, the pier had to be temporarily closed starting 1 April 2021.

See also
 Transportation in Taiwan

References

Piers in Nantou County